Noršinci pri Ljutomeru is a settlement northwest of Ljutomer in northeastern Slovenia. The area traditionally belonged to the Styria region and is now included in the Mura Statistical Region.

Name
The name of the settlement was changed from Noršinci to Noršinci pri Ljutomeru in 1955.

Cultural heritage
The local chapel-shrine in the centre of the village was built in the last quarter of the 19th century.

References

External links
Noršinci pri Ljutomeru on Geopedia

Populated places in the Municipality of Ljutomer